National Highway 361F, commonly referred to as NH 361F is a national highway in India. It is a secondary route of National Highway 61.  NH-361F runs in the state of Maharashtra in India.

Route 
NH361F connects Loha, Palam, Gangakhed, Parli Vaijnath, Telgaon, Wadvani, Beed, Arvi and Kharwandi in the state of Maharashtra.

Junctions  
 
  Terminal near Loha.
  Terminal near Kharwandi.

See also 
 List of National Highways in India
 List of National Highways in India by state

References

External links 

 NH 361F on OpenStreetMap

National highways in India
National Highways in Maharashtra